Osama Qashoo (born in Palestine) is filmmaker artist, human rights advocate and co-founder of the International Solidarity Movement (ISM), a Palestinian-led movement committed to resisting the Israeli occupation of Palestinian land using nonviolent, direct-action methods and principles.

Career

Having studied in the United Kingdom and completed further training in the United States, France and Cuba, Qashoo is known for his cross-platform work covering the themes of identity, diversity, migration, equality and global justice. His films have been broadcast internationally and typically explore the power of youth as a force for social change and creativity, in particular in the Arab world.

Qashoo established 'Olive Tree Films', a multi-disciplinary production company, based in the UK and Palestine. Through filmmaking, its primary aim is to expose the un-told stories of minority and marginalised people across the world to a mainstream audience.

Qashoo has co-founded several social action movements including:
 Egality
 Free Gaza Movement
 Give Your Vote
 International Solidarity Movement

Qashoo's first feature film is currently in pre-production. 'Emergency Radio,' is a story of two young men coming of age as radio DJs in Palestine.

Works
 
 Qashoo, Osama (August 23, 2008). "Intimidation will not stop our boats sailing for Gaza." The Guardian.

References

Further reading

External links
 

Living people
Palestinian human rights activists
Year of birth missing (living people)